Transtillaspis curiosissima is a species of moth of the family Tortricidae. It is found in Loja Province, Ecuador.

The wingspan is about 21 mm.  The ground colour of the forewings is grey cream, sprinkled with brownish grey and dotted with black. The markings are brownish grey. The hindwings are cream, but whiter basad and tinged with brownish terminally.

Etymology
The species name refers to the peculiar shapes of the male genitalia and is derived from Latin curious (meaning most interesting).

References

Moths described in 2008
Transtillaspis
Taxa named by Józef Razowski